Knockoura  is a mountain on the Beara Peninsula in County Cork, Ireland.

Geography 
At an elevation of 490 metres Knockoura is one of the Irish Hangliding & Paragliding (IHPA) sites as well as being a site for 4 communications masts for telephone, TV, VHF, coastguard and WiMax antennas.

References

See also 
 List of Marilyns in Ireland

Mountains and hills of County Cork
Marilyns of Ireland